A virago sleeve is a women's item of clothing fashionable in the 1620s–1630s.  It is a full "paned" or "pansied" sleeve (that is, made of strips of fabric) gathered into two puffs by a ribbon or fabric band above the elbow.

See also
Sleeve
1600–1650 in fashion

References
Gordenker, Emilie E.S.: Van Dyck and the Representation of Dress in Seventeenth-Century Portraiture, Brepols, 2001, 

17th-century fashion
Sleeves
History of clothing (Western fashion)

See also